Stanisław Zaremba may refer to:

 Stanisław Zaremba (bishop of Kyiv) (?–1648), writer, abbot, Cistercian, bishop of Kyiv
 Stanisław Zaremba (mathematician) (1863–1942)